Judge Bissell may refer to:

Jean Galloway Bissell (1936–1990), judge of the United States Court of Appeals for the Federal Circuit
John Winslow Bissell (born 1940), judge of the United States District Court for the District of New Jersey

See also
Clark Bissell (1782–1857), associate justice of the Connecticut Supreme Court